The Servais Prize for Literature is a Luxembourgish literary award, awarded since 1992 by the Servais Foundation. It is judged by a jury, and can be bestowed upon any writer from Luxembourg, regardless of format or language.

List of laureates

Encouragement Prize

See also
Literature of Luxembourg

External links
 National Literature Centre

Awards established in 1992
Luxembourgian literary awards